Virginia's 72nd House of Delegates district elects one of 100 seats in the Virginia House of Delegates, the lower house of the state's bicameral legislature. District 72, in Henrico County, Virginia, is represented by Democrat Schuyler VanValkenburg, who was first elected in 2017.

District officeholders

References

External links
 

Government in Henrico County, Virginia
Virginia House of Delegates districts